António Ferreira Gonçalves dos Reis, known as António Reis (27 August 1927 – 10 September 1991), was a Portuguese film director, screenwriter and producer, poet, sculptor and ethnographer. He was married to Margarida Cordeiro, co-director of most of his films. He is considered one of the most important directors of his country, due to the originality of his style.

He was a teacher at the Lisbon Theatre and Film School for several years. His work and films influenced subsequent directors. This influence originated a cinematographic family commonly referred to as The School of Reis. His only daughter Ana Cordeiro Reis is a writer and contemporary composer.

Filmography
1959 : Auto de Floripes (co-director)
1963 : Painéis do Porto
1964 : Do Céu ao Rio (co-director with César Guerra Leal)
1966 : Alto do Rabagão (co-director with César Guerra Leal)
1966 : Mudar de Vida (directed by Paulo Rocha, script by António Reis)
1974 : Jaime
1976 : Trás-os-Montes (co-director with Margarida Cordeiro)
1985 : Ana (co-director with Margarida Cordeiro)
1989 : Rosa de Areia (co-director with Margarida Cordeiro)

Notes

References
  O Cais do Olhar by José de Matos-Cruz, Portuguese Cinematheque, 1999

See also
 The School of Reis
 O Acto da Primavera (1962), directed by Manoel de Oliveira, assisted by António Reis

External links
 António Reis at the Harvard Film Archive

Portuguese film directors
1927 births
1991 deaths
People from Vila Nova de Gaia